Málkov may refer to places in the Czech Republic:

Málkov (Beroun District), a municipality and village in the Central Bohemian Region
Málkov (Chomutov District), a municipality and village in the Ústí nad Labem Region
Málkov, a village and part of Přimda in the Plzeň Region